Palo Arco Airport  is an airport serving the canton of Nandayure in Guanacaste Province, Costa Rica. There is rising terrain in all quadrants.

See also

 Transport in Costa Rica
 List of airports in Costa Rica

References

External links
 OurAirports - Palo Arco Airport
 OpenStreetMap - Palo Arco
 HERE Maps - Palo Arco
 FallingRain - Palo Arco Airport
 

Airports in Costa Rica
Guanacaste Province